Abdul Aziz is a Pakistani cleric and sermon preacher at Lal Masjid, Islamabad, which was the site of a siege in 2007 with the Pakistani army. He is also the current Chancellor of Jamia Hafsa and Jamia Faridia, Aziz was released from custody by the Supreme Court of Pakistan in 2009 and acquitted in 2013.

Early life

He is an ethnic Baloch, descending from the Sadwani clan of the Mazari tribe, in the town of Rojhan in Rajanpur, the border district of Punjab province of Pakistan. He first came to Islamabad as a six-year-old boy from his home town in Rajanpur, when his father was appointed Khatib of Lal Masjid in 1966.

He studied for few years in a public school from where he completed his Matriculation and then joined Jamia Farooqia in Karachi, and later completed his Dars-i Nizami from Jamia Uloom-ul-Islamia, a Madrasa in Karachi

Aziz later served at The Mujaddiya Mosque in F-8, Islamabad as its Imam, he would also regularly visit his father at the Red Mosque and travel with him to Faridia University.

Father's Assassination 
On October 17, 1998, Aziz's father who had a routine every day whereby he would walk to his seminary Faridia University in Sector E-7 Of Islamabad for giving lectures, and return by car at noon. As he got out of the car,  Abdul Aziz approached him and spoke to him, when suddenly a man standing in front of the mosque's door walked towards him and pulled out a gun and fired until the magazine was empty, badly injuring Abdullah. Afterwards, he fired at Abdul Aziz, who barely escaped death. The assassin escaped with the help of an accomplice waiting outside in a car. Abdullah died of his injuries on the way to the hospital

Lal Masjid

Following his father's assassination, Aziz was appointed Cleric of Lal Masjid and succeeded his father as the Chancellor of Faridia University and Jamia Hafsa.
 
He closely followed the supreme leader of the Taliban, Mullah Omar, and typically resisted being photographed.

He also warned the government of attacks in the case of a violent police operation launched against the seminary. "If the government fails to eradicate all these moral evils from the society within the specified period of one month the students of the seminary would themselves take actions against all the people involved in such activities," said Abdul Aziz while addressing Friday Prayer congregation at Lal Masjid.

Final Showdown 

On 3 July 2007, the standoff with the government ended in bloody gun battles in which some publications claim that more than 1,000 Students were killed and scores wounded. The official death toll is much lower, at fewer than 300.

On 4 July 2007 at 8:05 AM, Aziz was arrested while leaving the complex disguised in a burqa. The reason for his cross-dressing escape was later revealed to be that he was called "by a senior official of an intelligence agency with whom he has been in touch for a long time" (Aziz admitted that he and his brother Ghazi had done this many times before when they were declared wanted by the government). Since this man could not enter into the mosque to meet him, he asked Maulana Aziz to come down to Aabpara police station, situated on a walking distance from the mosque and asked him to wear a burqa to avoid identification.

Release
Aziz was released on 16 April 2009 by the Supreme Court of Pakistan as he awaited trial on Alleged charges of murder, incitement, and kidnapping. He was greeted by throngs of supporters. Since then he has worked as an imam in the Red Mosque and runs seminaries including Jamia Faridia and Jamia Hafsa

Since 2001, 27 different cases have been filed unsuccessfully against him.

Bibliography

Books by Aziz
Islami nizam ka mujawwiza khaka (Proposed Blueprint Of Islamic System)
Allah ki azeem naimat (The Great Blessings Of God)

References

External links 
 Lal Masjid.
 Maulana Abdul Aziz on IMDB
 Dawn News report on Aziz's arrest.
 Pakistani government 
 and Taliban hold talks

Living people
1963 births
Baloch people
Deobandis
Pakistani prisoners and detainees
Pakistani religious leaders
People from Islamabad
People from Karachi
People from Rajanpur District
Jamia Uloom-ul-Islamia alumni